Alexander Harper (February 5, 1786December 1, 1860) was a U.S. Representative from Ohio for three different non-consecutive tenures in the mid-19th century.

Biography 
Born near Belfast in the Kingdom of Ireland, Harper immigrated to the United States and settled in Zanesville, Ohio. He pursued preparatory studies, studied law, was admitted to the bar in 1813, and commenced practice in Zanesville. He served as member of the Ohio House of Representatives in 1820 and 1821. He served as president judge of the Court of Common Pleas 1822–1836.

Congress 
Harper was elected as a Whig to the Twenty-fifth Congress (March 4, 1837 – March 3, 1839). He was later elected to the Twenty-eighth and Twenty-ninth Congresses (March 4, 1843 – March 3, 1847). He served as chairman of the Committee on Expenditures in the Post Office Department (Twenty-eighth Congress), and was on the Committee on Patents (Twenty-eighth Congress).

Harper was again elected to the Thirty-second Congress (March 4, 1851 – March 3, 1853). He resumed the practice of law.

Death
He died in Zanesville on December 1, 1860, and was interred in Greenwood Cemetery.

Sources

1786 births
1860 deaths
Members of the Ohio House of Representatives
Ohio state court judges
Politicians from Zanesville, Ohio
Politicians from Belfast
Irish emigrants to the United States (before 1923)
Whig Party members of the United States House of Representatives from Ohio
19th-century American politicians
19th-century American judges